Yehor Volodymyrovych Chehurko (born 27 January 1995) is a Ukrainian amateur footballer who plays as a striker for Kolos Velyki Sorochyntsi.

Career
Chehurko is a product of the Yenakiyeve and Metalist Kharkiv academies.

He made his debut for FC Metalist in the match against FC Dynamo Kyiv on 1 March 2015 in the Ukrainian Premier League.

References

External links
 
 

1995 births
Living people
People from Horlivka
Ukrainian footballers
Association football forwards
FC Metalist Kharkiv players
FC Kolos Kovalivka players
FC Metalist 1925 Kharkiv players
SC Dnipro-1 players
FC Naftovyk-Ukrnafta Okhtyrka players
Ukrainian Premier League players
Ukrainian First League players
Ukrainian Second League players
Sportspeople from Donetsk Oblast